Özalp is a masculine Turkish given name. The name is produced by using two Turkish words: öz and alp. In Turkish, öz means "soul", "nucleus", and/or "self" whereas alp means "stouthearted", "brave", "chivalrous", "daredevil", "valorous", and/or "gallant". Therefore, Özalp means "immanently gallant" or "inherently valorous".

Notable persons with the given name Özalp include:

 Özalp Babaoğlu, Turkish computer scientist

Turkish masculine given names